This is a list of cities that Flynas flies as of July 2022.

List

References

flynas